Abdul Basir Salangi or Abdul Baseer Salangi, born on 8 August 1962 in Parwan, is the ethnic Tajik current Governor of Farah province in Afghanistan,
 and was a commander in the Afghan Civil War, aligned with Jamiat-e Islami and Ahmad Shah Massoud. Additionally, he was chief of Kabul after the fall of the Taliban until he was replaced by General Baba Jan after being indicted in the Shinpur scandal.

Karzai administration
Following the fall of the Taliban government in 2001, Salangi was appointed as the chief of police for Kabul. However the Afghan Independent Human Rights Commission accused him of bulldozing 300 poor houses in the Shinpur district of Kabul and making room for warlords to put their houses. Following this Salangi was removed from his post and assigned as Police Chief of the volatile Wardak Province where he stayed until 2005. In 2008 Salangi was posted as governor of Parwan.

In 2010, as governor, he directed rescue efforts in the region after an avalanche struck the province.

Assassination attempts
Salangi has been a target of assassinations like many other Afghan politicians and government officials. On August 14, 2011, a team of about six suicide bombers launched a coordinated assault on the governor's palace in Charikar. Although Salangi survived the high-profile assassination, 19 other people were killed in the incident. The attack began with a car bomb explosion outside the front gate of his palace followed by suicide bombers storming in and blowing themselves up in the compound. Gen. Abdul Jalil Rahimi of the Afghan National Police said he was at a meeting with Salangi, Afghan army and police officials, and at least two NATO police advisers, when the assault began. He further said that "two of the bombers were able to get into the building of the governor's house", but were killed before they could reach their main targets. As usual, the Taliban claimed responsibility.

Second Resistance
In January 2021, while addressing a memorial ceremony for the victims of the 14 January 1989 massacre in the Salang district of central Parwan Province, Salangi said that 'if the Taliban were unwilling to embrace peace, the people of Afghanistan would form a second resistance front against them'.

References

External links

Living people
Governors of Parwan Province
People from Parwan Province
Governors of Farah Province
Jamiat-e Islami politicians
Afghan police officers
Chiefs of police
Afghan Tajik people
1962 births